Bosencheve National Park, also known as the Bosencheve Buffer Zone, is a national park and protected area located in Michoacán, Mexico and State of Mexico, Mexico. The park was established in 1940 and is approximately 146 square kilometers.
The national park has two lake Lago Verde and Lago Seca.
The park a good amount of hiking trails. It is also 2 hours west of Mexico City.
https://vibeadventures.com/10-stunning-national-parks-for-a-great-hike-around-mexico-city/

References 

National parks of Mexico
Protected areas of the State of Mexico
Protected areas of Michoacán
Protected areas of the Trans-Mexican Volcanic Belt